NGC 252 is a lenticular galaxy located in the constellation Andromeda. It was discovered by William Herschel in 1786.

See also 
List of NGC objects

References

External links
 

Andromeda (constellation)
Lenticular galaxies
Astronomical objects discovered in 1786
0252
002819